War Machine is a Marvel comic book superhero.

War Machine, War machine, or Warmachine may also refer to:

People 

 War Machine (mixed martial artist) (born 1981), American former professional mixed martial artist; born Jon Koppenhaver before making this his legal name; infamous for his current incarceration for the beating of adult performer Christy Mack.

Arts, entertainment, and media

Games 

 War Machine, a 1989 video game published by Players Premier Software
 Warmachine, a miniatures wargame

Literature 

 War Machine, a partwork published by Orbis Publishing
 "Nomadology: The War Machine", a book by Gilles Deleuze and Félix Guattari, later incorporated into their book A Thousand Plateaus
 The War Machine, a 1989 science fiction novel
 James Rupert "Rhodey" Rhodes, friend of Tony Stark in the Marvel universe
 The War Machine, a gaming newsletter

Music 

 War Machine (album), a 1980 album by Andrea True
 "War Machine", a song by AC/DC from Black Ice
 "War Machine", a song by Fightstar from Be Human
 "War Machine", a song by Kiss from Creatures of the Night

Other uses in arts, entertainment, and media 

 War Machine (film), a 2017 American satirical war film
 The War Machines, the ninth and final serial of the third season in the British science fiction television series Doctor Who

Other uses 

 War Machine (professional wrestling), an American professional wrestling tag team
 War machine, shorthand for the military–industrial complex

See also 

 Fighting machine, many of which are used in motorized warfare
 Mechanized warfare, which involves war machines